Kilk Records is a Tokyo independent record label. Established by Daichi Mori in 2010 it publishes Japanese and Western artists in Japan.

Artists
Artists signed to Kilk include;
 Manuok
 Yagya
 Chris Olley
 Papercutz
 Ekko, Frithjof Toksvig from The Poets
 Cellzcellar
 Tie These Hands
 Ferri
 Glaschelim
 コッテル
 Lööf
 虚弱。(Kyojaku)
 Melodique

See also
List of record labels

External links
Company homepage:

References

Japanese record labels